Harrisburg's Market Square is located in Downtown Harrisburg at the intersection of 2nd and Market Streets. The square was created in 1785. Since then, it has traditionally been the navigational center of the city, and since the 1980s has undergone a revival with several new commercial, residential and retail spaces either planned or built. Market Square serves as a hub for Capital Area Transit (CAT) buses. It is one block from Riverfront Park and the Market Street Bridge, which crosses over the Susquehanna River.

History

John Harris, Jr. the founder of Harrisburg had his son-in-law, William Maclay, draw up a plan for the town in 1785. Market Street, envisioned as the grand avenue of the new town, was planned at eighty feet wide. Where it intersected with Second Street, Maclay planned in ample setbacks to allow for a “Market Square,” which has remained a prominent feature of Harrisburg to this present day.

Since the 1980s, open concerts performed by professional artists have taken place at Market Square.

See also
 Market Square in Pittsburgh
 List of city squares

References

Buildings and structures in Harrisburg, Pennsylvania
Squares in the United States
Urban public parks
Tourist attractions in Harrisburg, Pennsylvania